The Bragg House is a historic house in rural Ouachita County, Arkansas. The house is basically rectangular in plan, with a hip roof. Its main entrance is sheltered by a two-story temple-style portico, with four columns topped with Doric capitals, and a turned-baluster railing on the second floor. Peter Newport Bragg began construction of the house in 1842, but did not complete it until 1850. The house was built out of virgin lumber sawn on Bragg's sawmill by his slaves; it remains in the hands of Bragg's descendants.

The house was listed on the National Register of Historic Places in 1974.

See also
National Register of Historic Places listings in Ouachita County, Arkansas

References

Houses on the National Register of Historic Places in Arkansas
Houses completed in 1850
Houses in Ouachita County, Arkansas
National Register of Historic Places in Ouachita County, Arkansas
1850 establishments in Arkansas